Rabiʽ al-Awwal (also known as Rabi' al-Ula, or Rabi' I, is the third month of the Islamic calendar.  The name Rabī‘ al-awwal means "the first month or beginning of spring", referring to its position in the pre-Islamic Arabian calendar.

During this month, the majority of Muslims celebrate Mawlid, the birthday of the Islamic prophet Muhammad. Other Muslims do not believe the celebration is evidenced as necessary or even Islamically permissible in the Quran or authentic Hadith and has evolved as an imitation of the Christian celebration of Jesus' birthday on Christmas. Although Muhammad's exact birthday is unknown, some Muslims believe it to have been the twelfth of this month.

In the days of the Ottoman Empire, the name of this month in Ottoman Turkish was Rèbi' ulèvvèl, with the abbreviation Ra. In modern Turkish, it is Rebiülevvel.

Meaning
The word "Rabi" means "spring" and Al-awwal means "the first" in the Arabic language, so "Rabi' al-awwal" means "the first spring" in Arabic. The name seems to have to do with the celebratory events in the month, as spring marks the end of winter (a symbol of sadness) and consequently the start of happiness. As the Islamic calendar is a purely lunar calendar, the month naturally rotates over solar years, so Rabīʽ al-awwal can fall in spring or any other season. Therefore, the month cannot be related to the actual season of spring.

Celebrations

Although historians and scholars disagree on the exact date of Muhammad's birth, it is celebrated by some Muslims on the 12th or 17th of Rabi' al-awwal.

However, some Muslims do not celebrate the Prophet's birthday, as neither the Prophet himself nor any of his companions observed any such birthday celebrations, and they do not consider it an Islamic obligation nor an act of any religious merit with any basis in the Quran or in any authentic Hadith.

When the celebration of the Mawlid is done by Muslims, it is done differently depending on the country. In some areas, celebrations begin as early as the first of the month and can continue till the end of the month. Muslims generally put coloured lights on roads, streets, and their homes and fly green flags as well to celebrate.

In many countries, a procession is also conducted on the night and day of the 12th or 17th of Rabi' al-awwal. On these occasions, sweets and drinks are also distributed widely from home to home and to the general public. In some areas, Muslims also exchange gifts.

Timing
The Islamic calendar is a purely lunar calendar, and months begin when the first crescent of a new moon is sighted. Since the Islamic lunar year is 11 to 12 days shorter than the solar year, Rabī‘ al-Awwal migrates throughout the seasons. The estimated start and end dates for Rabī‘ al-Awwal are as follows (based on the Umm al-Qura calendar of Saudi Arabia):

Islamic events
 01 Rabī‘ al-Awwal 897 AH, the fall of the Emirate of Granada, the final Muslim kingdom of al-Andalus
 08 Rabī‘ al-Awwal, death of Imam Hassan Al-Askari Twelver Imām, Hasan al-‘Askarī (see: Chup Tazia)
 09 Rabī‘ al-Awwal, Eid e shuja
 12 Rabī‘ al-Awwal, Sunni Muslims observe Mawlid in commemoration of Muhammad's birthday
 13 Rabi‘ al-Awwal, Death of [Umm Rubab] (beloved wife of Imam Hussain) 
 17 Rabī‘ al-Awwal, Shia celebrate the birthday of the Imām Ja‘far al-Sādiq.
 18 Rabī‘ al-Awwal, birth of Umm Kulthum bint Ali
 26 Rabī‘ al-Awwal 1333 AH, death of Khwaja Sirajuddin Naqshbandi, a Naqshbandi Sufi shaykh

Other events:

 The Hijra (migration) took place in this month
 Eid-e-Zahra (a.k.a. Eid e shuja), a celebration of Shi‘ah Muslims
 Marriage of Muhammad to Khadijah bint Khuwaylid
 Building of the Quba Mosque (first mosque in Islam)
 The week including 12th and 17th is called Islamic Unity Week in Iran to address both Sunni and Shia views on the birth date of Mohammad.

References

External links
 12 Rabi Ul Awwal
 Islamic-Western Calendar Converter (Based on the Arithmetical or Tabular Calendar)

3
Islamic terminology

kk:Рабииғул әууәл
sv:Rabi' al-Awwal